Harihara II (1342–1404 CE) was a emperor of the Vijayanagara Empire from the Sangama Dynasty. He patronised Kannada poet Madhura, a Jaina. An important work on Vedas was completed during his time. He earned the titles Vaidikamarga Sthapanacharya and Vedamarga Pravartaka.

Biography
He became ruler when Bukka Raya I died in 1377 and ruled till his death in 1404. He was succeeded by Virupaksha Raya.

During his reign, he continued to extend the kingdom's territory through fighting against the Reddis of Kondavidu for control of the Andhra between Nellore and Kalinga. From the Reddis of Kondavidu, Harihara II conquered the Addanki and Srisailam areas as well as most of the territory between the peninsula to the south of the river Krishna, which would eventually lead to fights in Telangana with the Velamas of Rachakonda. Harihara II took advantage of the death of Mujahid Bahmani in 1378 and extended his control into the northwest, controlling such ports as Goa, Chaul, and Dabhol.

Harihara II ruled from the capital Vijayanagara now more popularly known as Hampi. What is believed to be the ruins of Harihara's palace is located among the Hampi ruins.

His general Iruguppa was a disciple of Simhanandi, a Jain teacher. He built a tank for Gomatteshvara (Bahubali) and the stone temple of Kumthu-Jinanatha at Vijayanagara.

During his fight against the Reddis of Kondavidu, he delegated the rule of Mysore and the task of fighting the Dalvoys in Mysore to Yaduraya, thereby appointing the first ruler of another mighty future-kingdom.

References

Sources 
 
 Dr. Suryanath U. Kamat, Concise history of Karnataka, MCC, Bangalore, 2001 (Reprinted 2002)

External links
 Andhra Pradesh Online

1404 deaths
15th-century Indian monarchs
Sangama dynasty
1377 births
Indian Hindus
Hindu monarchs
14th-century Indian monarchs